1975 in Korea may refer to:
1975 in North Korea
1975 in South Korea